Star is a compilation album released by the South Korean boyband Super Junior on 27 January 2021 in Japan under the label Avex Trax. The album compiled the band's past Japanese and Korean singles that were released since 2013. It peaked at number 3 on Oricon Daily Chart on the day of its release.

Background
Since the released of their last Japanese EP I Think U, the band Super Junior had released two singles through their subunits. Super Junior-K.R.Y. released Traveler in October 2020 and Super Junior-D&E released Wings in November 2020. Star was described as the final piece to be released to complete the trilogy.

Star was released on 27 January 2021, as a compilation album to celebrate the band's 15th anniversary. The album compiled the band's previous singles and featured two new tracks. The title track, "Star" is described as an up-tempo dance song with exciting beat and playful melody. The song's lyrics represent the beginning of a new adventure and aiming for the stars; expressing gratitude to their fans and wishes to continue their journey together. The other track is a solo song self-written by Leeteuk. The song was previously sung by the artist during his fan meeting tour in 2016 but was never officially released. The album peaked at number three on Billboard Japan Top Album Sales chart on its first week of sales, selling 24,200 copies.

Track listing

Charts

Release history

References

Avex Trax albums 
Super Junior albums 
2021 albums